Crito (  or) is a dialogue that was written by the ancient Greek philosopher Plato. It depicts a conversation between Socrates and his wealthy friend Crito of Alopece regarding justice (δικαιοσύνη), injustice (ἀδικία), and the appropriate response to injustice after Socrates's imprisonment, which is chronicled in the Apology.

In Crito, Socrates believes injustice may not be answered with injustice, personifies the Laws of Athens to prove this, and refuses Crito's offer to finance his escape from prison. The dialogue contains an ancient statement of the social contract theory of government. In contemporary discussions, the meaning of Crito is debated to determine whether it is a plea for unconditional obedience to the laws of a society. The text is one of the few Platonic dialogues that appear to be unaffected by Plato's opinions on the matter; it is dated to have been written around the same time as the Apology.

Background 

Crito, which may be based on a historical event, is thought to have been published in 399 BCE. Since his trial in Apology, Socrates had been imprisoned for four weeks and will be executed in a matter of days.

Plato's representation of Socrates is intimate but because it is a literary work, the historical validity of what was said and how much of Plato's interpretation of Socrates aligns with his real beliefs is uncertain.

Socrates and Crito are the only characters in the story. Crito was a rich Athenian who like Socrates was from deme of Alopece. Once Socrates was charged with corrupting the youth and impiety, Crito unsuccessfully vouched to pay his bail. To spare him the prison sentence after Socrates was sentenced to death, Crito was ready to pledge to the court that Socrates would not flee, a plea that was ultimately rejected. Through both the trial and the execution, Crito was present.

In other dialogues, Crito is portrayed as a conventional Athenian who could not understand Socrates' philosophy despite his attempts to do so.

Unlike many of Plato's potential works, Crito is widely considered to be a genuine dialogue. In recent research, Holger Thesleff doubted its authenticity. Some have said Crito is part of Plato's middle dialogues, which are characterized by a Socrates who dismantled opposing arguments by asking questions and then pointing out the flaws in the opposition's theory. However, consensus places it in his early bibliography, which is characterized by a Socrates who speaks as an expert on the subject.

According to Mario Montuori and Giovanni Reale, Crito was written closer in time to the Laws than to the Apology, whose date is controversial. The piece was written after Socrates' execution in 399 BCE.

According to Xenophon, Plato's friends drafted escape plans. The extent the theoretical plan aligned with the historical ones is unknown. Some historians of philosophy assume the Socratic figure depicted in Crito is similar to the historical figure. William K. C. Guthrie considers the social contract to be true to Socrates' philosophical interests.

Summary

Crito's arguments 
In the early morning, before visitors may arrive to meet with prisoners, Crito arrives at Socrates' cell and bribes the guard for entry. Once inside, he sits beside Socrates until he wakes up. Upon waking, Socrates remarks that Crito arrived early. Crito expresses concern at Socrates' relaxed attitude to his upcoming execution. Socrates responds that he is almost 70 years old and that to be scared of death would be inappropriate.

Crito has come to see Socrates because he has learned his execution will take place the next day, and wishes to rescue his friend. Crito planned to bribe all of the guards who are part of the execution and assures Socrates he has enough money to see the plan through and that he has additional friends who are also willing to pay. After being rescued from prison, Socrates would be taken to a home in Thessaly, where Crito and his friends would be pleased to house and feed him.

Crito asserts that if Socrates is executed, Crito will suffer a personal misfortune through the loss of a great friend. Crito also says if Socrates is executed, his sons will be deprived of the privileges to which the sons of a philosopher would be entitled—a proper education and living conditions. He also points out that when one takes on the responsibility of having children, it is immoral to abandon that duty.  Additionally, if Socrates did not go with them, it will reflect poorly upon Crito and his friends because people would believe they were too miserly to save Socrates. Crito also claims that it is important that they consider the thoughts of the majority as they "can inflict … the greatest evils if one is slandered among them". Finally, Crito argues that Socrates should not worry about the potential punishments that he and his conspirators could face as they feel that the risk is worth taking.

Socrates' arguments 

After hearing Crito's arguments, Socrates asks to be allowed to respond with a discussion of related, open-ended issues, to which Crito may not respond. As Socrates continues with his arguments, Crito only affirms Socrates' words. Socrates first says the opinions of the educated should be taken into consideration and that the opinions of those with subjective biases or beliefs may be disregarded. Likewise, the popularity of an opinion does not make it valid. Socrates uses the analogy of an athlete listening to his physician rather than his supporters because the physician's knowledge makes his opinion more valuable. According to Socrates, damage to the soul in the form of injustice makes life worthless for a philosopher in the same way life for a person who has injured himself out of incompetence is pointless. A person's goal should be to live a virtuous and just life rather than a long one, thus escape from the prison would rely on a discussion on justice.

Socrates disregards Crito's fears of a damaged reputation and his children's futures, which are irrelevant to him. He compares such motivations to a person who sentences someone to death and then regrets the action. Socrates then says Crito and his friends should know better because they have shared the same principles for a long time and that abandoning them at their age would be childish. To wrong the state, even in reaction to an injustice, would be an injustice.

Laws and justice 
Socrates then points out the question would then be whether he should harm someone or ignore a just obligation. To solve this question, he creates a personification of the Laws of Athens and speaks through its point of view, which is to defend the state and its decision against Socrates. 

According to Socrates, the Laws would argue a state cannot exist without respect for its rules. They would criticize Socrates for believing he and every other citizen had the right to ignore court judgments because chaos could ensue. Thus, Socrates could refute this particular instance as an unjust decision of the law, while maintaining that the law itself is just and should be obeyed. Socrates could justify his disobeying this legal ruling as just on these grounds. This argument, which mirrors Martin Luther King’s argument on unjust laws, is perhaps the best answer to the form of social contract theory that Socrates puts forward. However, Crito is never allowed to make this argument because Socrates cuts him off. 

According to the Laws, if Socrates had accepted Crito's offer, he would have exposed his accomplices to the risk of fleeing or losing their assets. As a fugitive in a well-established state, Socrates would be suspicious of good citizens because he would be suspected of violating the laws in his place of exile. He would have to be content with a region like Thessaly, which was chaotic and disorganized, and where he could only entertain crowds with the story of his unjust escape. As a philosopher who had become unfaithful to his principles, he would be  discredited and would have to give up his previous life content and his sense of life would only be through food. 

In conclusion, if Socrates accepts his execution, he will be wronged by men rather than the law, remaining just. If he takes Crito's advice and escapes, Socrates would wrong the laws and betray his lifelong pursuit of justice. After completing the imaginary plea of the Laws, Socrates claims he was chained to the laws as a dancer is to flute music and asks Crito to rebuff him if he wishes. Crito has no objections. Before Crito leaves, Socrates refers to the divine guidance he hopes to be helped by.

Philosophical implications 
Crito emphasizes reason, which it says should be the sole criterion for understanding ethics. Unlike Plato's other works, Socrates took a more objective stance on epistemology, being optimistic about the knowledge coming from experts in a subject.

The ethical and political implications of the Laws are barely discussed in Crito, in which the Laws are personified to explain the way Socrates should have behaved.

Social contract 
The personification of the Laws is contrary to Plato's tendency to criticize the Athenian state and institutions. The state's demand for loyalty was a social contract theory in which citizens have a mutual agreement with the state and understand what being a citizen of the state entails. A person only became a citizen after undertaking a test called dokimasia (δοκιμασία); citizenship was not conferred at birth. The test is mentioned in Crito.

Legalism 
One of the most controversial issues raised by Crito is Socrates' legalist representation of the laws as a human being. It presents a view of society in which citizens who are incapable of changing laws by convincing lawmakers have to abide by the laws to remain "just". Those who do not want to live under such laws are to emigrate if they desire an ethical life. Although Socrates ultimately rejects the idea of expulsion, he believes it to be ethical because the court had suggested it and because the ruling was unjust. It followed, however, from the overall context of Platonic ethics in the sense that it prioritizes the avoidance of injustice.

Authoritarian and liberal interpretations 
Sandrine Bergès proposed a Liberal interpretation of the law in which the agreement between the state and the individual implies a mutual obligation. The legislation provides the citizens' livelihoods and an environment conducive to their prosperity and so they consider themselves to be loyal to the laws. Prosperity, in the sense of Socrates, means the formation of character – the acquisition of virtue as a prerequisite for a good life. In this sense, the analogy of the relationship between parent and child is to be understood as parents having the obligation to educate their children to be good people and can expect their children's obedience in return. The laws promote the virtue of citizens and should therefore be respected. In both cases, the parent entity must fulfill its obligation to be eligible for obedience. In the relationship between Socrates and the Athenian laws, this was the case despite the judgement of the court. If it was otherwise, there would be no obligation to comply with the laws. 

According to Richard Kraut, the laws required a serious effort to command respect. If this attempt was to fail, civil disobedience would be permissible. A number of critics, however, argue this could not be inferred from the text; rather, in the event of a failure of the conviction attempt, unconditional obedience to the law was demanded.

The Liberal interpretation of the personified laws has been controversial but one measuring "authoritarian" starting points to a Liberal outcome has found favor in recent research. The representatives of this approach assume the personification of the laws is to be understood in an authoritarian sense but either disagrees or partially agrees with Socrates' own position. Thus, although Plato's Socrates makes a case for this authoritarian rule, his order of values differed from their own.

Although Socrates is impressed by the reasoning of the laws, according to the weaker version of this hypothesis this does not mean he identifies with all of his reflections and affirms their consequences. According to the stronger variant, he agrees to the laws only with regard to the result – the refusal to flee – but rejects the way in which they have come to the conclusion. In principle his approval of the ethical understanding of the laws is not serious but ironic.

According to representatives of this interpretation Socrates, at the end of the dialogue, compares the effect the pleading of the Laws has on him with the "frenzied dervishes of Cybele seem to hear the flutes". This was an irrational aspect that contrasts with the philosophical demand for unconditional reason. In Plato's works, Socrates appears as a philosopher who always acts rationally and stuns admirers with his extraordinary self-restraint while being exposed to strong emotions. The comparison with these "dervishes" is an indication there is a difference between the radical, suggestive demands of the law and Socrates' philosophically reflected position. Socrates' description of his emotion is ironic as in Apology, his defense speech to court, in which he ironically claims the persuasive power of his prosecutors has almost led him to forget himself.

The strong variant of the interpretation, which distinguishes Socrates' point of view from that of the Laws, is represented by Roslyn Weiss. She said although the dialogue's Crito is an old friend of Socrates and should have known Socratic ethics well, his reflections and reactions show he is not a philosophical man. According to Weiss's hypothesis, this was the reason Socrates let the Laws appear and assigns them the task of making it understandable to Crito – that is, authoritarian – that an escape would be wrong. Weiss saw this as an indication Socrates only introduces the Laws after Crito has told him he could not follow Socrates' philosophical argument. As a further indication, Weiss says Socrates describes the arguments as being in favor of respecting the law – like something a speaker would present. This expresses distancing because the Platonic Socrates generally rejects rhetoric as a dishonest, manipulative way of persuasion.

Thomas Alexander Szlezák also said the justification for Socrates' attitude towards his friend is emotional rather than not philosophically demanding because it is inevitably based on Crito's level of reflection. The crucial point for Socrates is in the Phaedo dialogue rather than Crito. Socrates in Crito avoids using the word "soul" – a concept that is introduced and discussed in various dialogues – and dealt with a metaphysically neutral paraphrase, apparently because Crito does not accept the philosophical assumption of an immortal soul.

According to David Bostock, the authoritarian concept is the exact view Plato wanted to convey in Crito. In later works Plato recognized the problems with this position and modified his point of view. A number of other commentators support the traditional interpretation that the position of the Laws was to identify with the Platonic Socrates.

Lawfulness and ethical autonomy 
Multiple researchers have claimed that there is a purposeful rhetorical incongruity between the Apology and Crito from Plato's representation of Socrates' dialogues. In the Apology, Socrates explained that he would not obey a hypothetical court verdict that forced him to renounce public philosophizing on pain of death, for such a demand would be an injustice to him.

Michael Roth claimed that there was no inconsistency, and that the real in Crito and the hypothetical in the Apology were two fundamentally different systems to be held to different standards. According to another solution, Socrates' argument in the Apology was of a purely theoretical nature, since a prohibition of philosophy had no legal basis and no situation was conceivable in which the court could have actually imposed such a penalty on Socrates, unless the defendant had proposed this himself.

Italian historians of philosophy Mario Montuori and Giovanni Reale used chronological distance to explain this difference: that The Apology and the Crito were written at different times and for different reasons. In the Apology — which was the younger work — Plato essentially reported what Socrates had said without much embellishment, but when writing Crito, he had given his thoughts on the matter through the mask of Socrates.

On the other hand, if Socrates' punishment could not occur, professor of morality Necip Fikri Alican argued that Socrates could not simply just be using meaningless thought experiments. Philosophy professor James Stephens simply believed the problem has no solution.

The (missing) soul 
The soul is oddly missing throughout the Crito. This is despite the fact that Francis Cornford referred to the Platonic doctrine of the soul as one of the "twin pillars of Platonism," with the other being the theory of Forms. There seems to have been a deep uncertainty regarding the soul in the Crito. Socrates in the Crito alludes to the soul when he mentions the part of us that has justice or injustice inside it, but he does not even name it as the soul (47e–48a). This has puzzled scholars for centuries. Scholars have tended to suppose that Plato, at this early point in his career, simply has not yet worked out all the features of the soul: is it a self-mover, the principle of life? Is it the bearer of moral properties? Is it a mind? Erwin Rohde argued that Plato simply did not yet know what the soul was. David Claus conducted a thorough survey of all mentions of and references to the soul in pre-Platonic Greek literature (such as the sophists, natural philosophers, tragedians, comedians, and medical writers) and concluded that Plato was the first to combine all the features of the soul into one concept, but that this conception of the soul did not take place in Plato's mind until the Laws; the absence of the soul from the Crito reflects the inchoate status of the soul at this point in Plato's intellectual development. Campbell agrees that Plato was the first, but he argues that Plato's psychology was developed earlier, such that readers of earlier dialogues such as the Phaedo can observe the casual oscillation between different roles that the soul plays; he maintains that the soul is a thinker and a mover at the same time because it moves things by means of its thoughts.

Interpretations and reception

Classical and Medieval 
Roman philosopher and politician Cicero interpreted Crito to mean citizens are obliged to serve the state out of gratitude.

In anti-Platonic circles, the piece was not well regarded. The philosopher Athenaeus said Crito serves as Plato's means of attacking the real-life Crito. Athenaeus said because Crito showed no philosophical ability, his inability to present a proper argument is to be expected. Another anti-Platonic author, the Epicurean Idomenus of Lampsacus, said the escape plan came from Aeschines of Sphettus rather than Crito and the names were transposed Aeschines was not favored by Plato.

Early modern 
The oldest manuscript of Crito was produced in 895 CE in Byzantium. In the Latin-speaking world, Crito was an unknown work but the Islamic world had produced translations of it for years. The Western world rediscovered Crito during the age of Renaissance humanism. The first Latin translation was made in 1410 by the Italian humanist and statesman Leonardo Bruni, who was not satisfied with this translation and worked upon another that was completed by 1427. Bruni was so satisfied with the arguments presented by the Laws that he had used them in his own work, De militia. A revision of Bruni's Latin translation was created by Rinuccio da Castiglione. Marsilio Ficino was the third humanist translator; he published the translation in Florence in 1484. The first edition of the Greek text was published in September 1513 in Venice by Aldo Manuzio in the complete edition of Plato's works, which was published by Marcus Musurus.

The philosopher David Hume (1711-1776) made reference to Crito as the only ancient text that holds the idea of a citizen's implicit promise of loyalty. He said Plato's Socrates founded the social contract in the manner of Whiggs and influences passive obedience as seen from the Tories.

Modern

Literary aspects 
Crito was esteemed by literary analysts including Paul Shorey, William Guthrie, and Thomas Alexander Szlezák, the last of whom said its "speech, argumentation and character are masterfully matched". Translator and philosopher Friedrich Schleiermacher said in his translation's introduction the work is not a dialogue invented by Plato but rather a successful conversation he had.

Philosophical aspects 
The philologist Ulrich von Wilamowitz-Moellendorff found no philosophical content in Crito. According to him, the dialogue teaches "about the duty of the citizen, but not in the abstract, rather Socratic; Athenian". Gabriel Danzig states the text presents Socrates as an "embarrassingly obedient and dutiful citizen"; in doing so, Plato wanted to justify him "to the good citizens who did not care about philosophy".

Danzig added that in contemporary specialist literature, Plato is considered to be only concerned with making Socrates understandable to his readers rather than philosophically presenting and justifying universal principles. Olof Gigon saw the dialogue as a light work that is welcoming to aspiring philosophers. Despite this, the work was regarded as a key Western parallel to Legalism according to philosopher Reginald E. Allen. Hellmut Flashar argued that despite its initial appearances, Crito depth can be discerned through dialogue and that in doing so, it may be revealed as a difficult text.

In modern discussions of law and order, the responsibilities of citizens to follow rules unconditionally has many commonalities with Crito'''s presentation of Crito's lenient understanding of the Laws and Socrates' rigid one. The text is a foundation in Anglo-Saxon studies on legal ethics. According to Flashar, attempting to apply modern ideas to Platonic philosophy estranges the themes.

The quality of the Laws' arguments are relative to one's interpretation; in research literature, those who interpret the piece as being "authoritarian" view the Laws' as having a weak argument that is based more on feeling than rationality. For instance, the metaphor of one's parents being a parallel to the state implies a debatable view of obligation rather than an objective one. Some have said Socrates is a vessel for Plato's beliefs. Defenders of the piece say this view ignores the possibility the arguments' weaknesses are inherent for the dialectical process. Romano Guardini emphasized the Crito inherent correctness, it being "the basic philosophical experience of validity" exists beyond empiricism.

According to Austrian philosopher Karl Popper, the representation of Socrates in Crito is the quintessential version of him and the piece may have been a request by Socrates himself. In tandem with the Apology, Socrates' last will may be formed. Socrates, who was convicted as an Athenian, chose not to flee Athens because of his virtue as an Athenian and the loyalty to the state that follows. If he chose to go into self-exile as Crito had suggested, he would undermine the fundamental system the state he pledges allegiance to was based upon. Peter Sloterdijk said Crito is one of the "initial texts of philosophy par excellence" with which Plato founded "a new way of looking for the truth". Crito was the defender of this world against the death of his master. He played a "half ridiculous, half moving role". For Socrates, life was a lesson so he consequently "turned his last breath into an argument and his last hour into evidence".

Texts and translations
Greek text at PerseusPlato: Euthyphro, Apology, Crito, Phaedo, Phaedrus. Greek with translation by Harold N. Fowler. Loeb Classical Library 36. Harvard Univ. Press (originally published 1914).
Fowler translation at PerseusPlato: Euthyphro, Apology, Crito, Phaedo. Greek with translation by Chris Emlyn-Jones and William Preddy. Loeb Classical Library 36. Harvard Univ. Press, 2017.  HUP listing
Plato. Opera, volume I. Oxford Classical Texts. 
Plato. Complete Works. Hackett, 1997. The Last Days of Socrates, translation of Euthyphro, Apology, Crito, Phaedo. Hugh Tredennick, 1954. . Made into a BBC radio play in 1986.

See also
 Trial of Socrates

 References 

 External links 

 
Translated by Woods & Pack, 2007
Bundled with Euthyphro, Socrates' Defense (aka Apology) and the death scene from Phaedo
 Jowett's translation of the Crito'', at the Internet Classics Archive
Approaching Plato: A Guide to the Early and Middle Dialogues
Guides to the Socratic Dialogues, a beginner's guide
 G. Theodoridis, 2015: full-text translation

Books in political philosophy
Dialogues of Plato
Political philosophy in ancient Greece